Putzi may refer to:

 a nickname of Ernst Hanfstaengl, an American-German diplomat
 Putzi, an opera in one act with music and libretto by Argentine composer Eduardo Alonso-Crespo
 Putzi fly, a type of fly responsible for myiasis